The 1977 IBF World Championships took place 1977 in Malmö, Sweden. Following the results of the men's doubles.

Main stage

Section 1

Section 2

Section 3

Section 4

Final stage

Remarks

External links 
http://newspapers.nl.sg/Digitised/Page/straitstimes19770505.1.22.aspx

Men's doubles